The 2016 Magyar Kupa (men's basketball) was the 50th season of the Hungarian Basketball Cup. Egis Körmend won its 7th national Cup championship. Trey McKinney-Jones was named Most Valuable Player. The tournament was held at the SYMA Sports and Conference Center in Budapest.

Qualification
Teams qualified based on their position in the 2015–16 Nemzeti Bajnokság I/A (men's basketball) season.

Bracket

Final

See also
 2015–16 Nemzeti Bajnokság I/A

References

External links
 Official website
 Hungarian Basketball Federaration 

Magyar Kupa